General elections were held in the Netherlands on 3 July 1918. They were the first elections held after a series of reforms that introduced universal male suffrage and pure proportional representation, replacing the previous system using first-past-the-post voting in single member constituencies. This change was known as the Great Pacification, which also included the introduction of state financing of religious schools, and led to the start of consociational democracy.

The change in the electoral system led to major changes in the political make-up of the House of Representatives. The confessional right-wing parties, the General League of Roman Catholic Caucuses, the Anti-Revolutionary Party and the Christian Historical Union, together won 50 seats. Along with two Christian splinter-parties (the Christian Democratic Party and the Christian Social Party) they were able to gain a majority of 52 seats.

The liberal parties lost the most seats. While in 1917, two of the liberal parties, the Liberal Union and the League of Free Liberals, had won 31 seats, they were now reduced to 10 seats. Together with three smaller liberal parties, liberals now held only 15 seats in the House of representatives.

The fragmentation of the House was caused by the low electoral threshold of just 0.5%, with the smallest party, the Alliance for the Democratisation of the Army, managing to win a seat with only 6,828 votes.

Results

References

General elections in the Netherlands
Netherlands
1918 in the Netherlands
Election and referendum articles with incomplete results
July 1918 events
1918 elections in the Netherlands